Atractaspis reticulata, or the reticulate burrowing asp, is a species of snake in the family Atractaspididae. It is found in Africa.

References

Sjöstedt, Y. 1896. Atractus reticulata, eine neue Schlange aus Kamerun. Zool. Anz. 19:516-517.

Atractaspididae
Reptiles described in 1896